The Wesleyan Philosophical Society (WPS) is an academic society largely represented by academic institutions affiliated with Christian denominations in the Wesleyan tradition. Despite its primarily Wesleyan orientation, there has been increasing participation from scholars in Catholic, Orthodox, and other Protestant (such as Lutheran and Pentecostal) traditions. Likewise, there are no formal doctrinal or affiliational requirements for membership in the society or participation (including as a presenter) at its conferences. Anyone with an interest in philosophical subjects pertaining to conference themes (broadly construed) is welcome to attend, regardless of his or her personal theological orientation or affiliation.

History
The society was conceived during a 2001 meeting of the Wesleyan Theological Society meeting at Azusa Pacific University in Azusa, California. Brint Montgomery, Thomas Jay Oord, and Robert Thompson served as the early organizing forces. The society first met in Hobe Sound, Florida in March 2002. The society has grown steadily since then, featuring up to approximately 30 papers (as space and time allow) per conference in recent years.

Publications
The WPS gives notice of its recent publications on its official website (see below). Typically, books result from the peer-reviewed process and presentation of annual papers at the conference. The WPS website is maintained by Brint Montgomery, professor of philosophy at Southern Nazarene University. The society's published books: 
 The Many Facets of Love: Philosophical Explorations. Cambridge Scholars Publishing, Thomas Jay Oord, editor. 2006 Select Proceedings.
Holiness Unto Truth. Intersections between Wesleyan and Roman Catholic Voices. Cambridge Scholars Publishing, L. Bryan Williams, editor. 2007 Select Proceedings.
 I More than Others: Responses to Evil and Suffering, Eric Severson, editor. 2009 select proceedings and invited essay from John Caputo (professor emeritus, Syracuse University and Villanova University)
 Gift and Economy: Ethics, Markets, and Morality. Cambridge Scholars Publishing, Eric Severson, editor.  2011 selected proceedings and invited essay from Richard Kearney, Boston College (co-authored by Eric Severson)
 This is My Body: Philosophical Reflections on Embodiment in a Wesleyan Spirit Pickwick, John Brittingham and Christina Smerick, eds. 2016
 In Spirit and In Truth: Philosophical Reflections on Liturgy and Worship, Claremont Press, Wm. Curtis Holtzen and Matthew Nelson Hill, eds. 2016 selected proceedings and invited essay from Nicholas Wolterstorff
 Connecting Faith and Science: Philosophical and Theological Inquiries, Claremont Press, Matthew Nelson Hill and Wm. Curtis Holtzen, eds. 2017 selected proceedings and invited essays

Conferences
WPS meets each year at various sites around the United States. While independent, the WPS has also maintains a relationship with the older Wesleyan Theological Society, meeting each year a day prior to the WTS at the same location.

2019: #MeToo, #BLM, #NeverAgain: Philosophy and the Politics of Culture Change, March 14, 2019 Wesley Seminary, Washington, DC 
2018: The Question of Identity and Personhood: Philosophical/Theological Reflections on the Self and Space, March 8, 2018 Pentecostal Theological Seminary, Cleveland, TN 
2017: Philosophy, Religion, and the Reality of Race, March 2, 2017  Asbury Theological Seminary, Wilmore, KY
2016: Thinking about the Book of Nature: Developing a Philosophy of Science and Religion, March 10, 2016  Point Loma Nazarene University, San Diego, CA 
2015: In Spirit and in Truth: Philosophical Reflections on Worship and Liturgy, March 6, 2015 Mount Vernon Nazarene University, Mount Vernon, Ohio
2014: This is My Body: Philosophical Explorations of Embodiment, March 6, 2014 Northwest Nazarene University, Nampa, Idaho
2013: Are There Good Reasons to Believe? Epistemology and Christian Faith, March, 21, 2013 Seattle Pacific University, Seattle, Washington
2012: Curb Your Enthusiasm? Philosophy and Religious Experience, March 1, 2012 Trevecca Nazarene University, Nashville, Tennessee
2011: Philosophy and Popular Culture: Medium, Message, and 'the Masses'.,  March 3, 2011, Southern Methodist University, Dallas, Texas
2010: Gift and Economy: Ethics, Hospitality and the Market., March 4, 2010, Azusa Pacific University, Azusa, California
2009: 'I More Than the Others:’ A Response to Evil and Suffering, 2009, Anderson University (Indiana), Anderson, Indiana
2008: Philosophy and Science: Contemporary Explorations, Duke University, Durham, North Carolina
2007: Themes of Wesleyan and Catholic Thought, Olivet Nazarene University, Bourbonnais, Illinois
2006: Love: Investigating its Meaning, History and Expressions,³ Nazarene Theological Seminary, Kansas City, Missouri
2005: Political and Social Philosophy, Seattle Pacific University, Seattle, Washington
2004: Virtue, Reason & Morality: Considering Ethics, Roberts Wesleyan College, Rochester, New York
2003: Religious Experience, Asbury Theological Seminary, Lexington, Kentucky
2002: Hobe Sound, Florida

Organization
WPS leadership is elected from members of the society at its annual business meeting during its conference. Its executive leadership consists of a President, 1st Vice-President,  and 2nd Vice-President.  The organisation also maintains a review coordinator for submissions, and a promotional secretary.

Past presidents
2018-2019: Matthew Hill, Spring Arbor University, Spring Arbor, Michigan
2017-2018: John Brittingham, Greenville College, Greenville, Illinois
2016-2017: Jim Stump, BioLogos
2015-2016: Wm. Curtis Holtzen, Hope International University, Fullerton, California
2014-2015: Christian Smerick, Greenville College, Greenville, Illinois
2013-2014: Joseph Bankard, Northwest Nazarene University, Nampa, Idaho
2012-2013: Teri Merrick, Azusa Pacific University, Azusa, California
2011-2012: Timothy Crutcher, Southern Nazarene University, Bethany, Oklahoma
2010–2011: Eric Severson, Eastern Nazarene College, Quincy, Massachusetts
2009–2010: Heather Ross, Point Loma Nazarene University, San Diego, California
2008–2009: Robert Thompson, Point Loma Nazarene University, San Diego, California
2007–2008: L. Bryan Williams, Warner Pacific College, Portland, Oregon
2006–2007: Craig Boyd, Azusa Pacific University, Azusa, California
2005–2006: Eric Manchester, Caldwell College, Caldwell, New Jersey
2004–2005: Barry Bryant, Memphis Theological Seminary, Memphis, Tennessee
2003–2004: Brint Montgomery, Southern Nazarene University, Bethany, Oklahoma
2002–2003: Thomas Jay Oord, Northwest Nazarene University, Nampa, Idaho

External links
Official Wesleyan Philosophical Society website

Philosophical societies in the United States
Organizations established in 2001
2001 establishments in California